The 2019 ASUN women's soccer tournament was the postseason women's soccer tournament for the ASUN Conference held from November 1 through November 9, 2019. The first round of the tournament was hosted at the first and second seed's home stadium.  Then the remaining rounds of the tournament were hosted by the higher seed.  The six-team single-elimination tournament consisted of three rounds based on seeding from regular season conference play. The Lipscomb Bison were the defending tournament champions, and successfully defended their crown, defeating Florida Gulf Coast in the final. It was the second consecutive title, and second title in program history for Lipscomb and coach Kevin O'Brien.

Bracket
Source:

Schedule

First Round

Semifinals

Final

Statistics

Goalscorers 
2 Goals
 Erin Harris (Kennesaw State)

1 Goal
 Avery Belk (Liberty)
 Lauren Chamberlain (NJIT)
 Becky Contreras (Kennesaw State)
 Isabella Contreras (Kennesaw State)
 Olivia Doak (Lipscomb)
 Morgan Harrison (Kennesaw State)
 Kara Kyramarios (Florida Gulf Coast)
 Evdokia Popadinova (Florida Gulf Coast)
 Carly Pressgrove (Kennesaw State)
 Thais Reiss (North Florida)
 Danielle Van Liere (Lipscomb)

All-Tournament team

Source:

MVP in bold

References 

 
ASUN Women's Soccer Tournament